Cyclodecane is a cycloalkane with the chemical formula C10H20.

References

External links
 

Cycloalkanes
Ten-membered rings